Thomas Scollan (1884 – 28 October 1974) was a Scottish trade unionist and Labour Party politician.

Scollan was an engineer, and an organiser for the National Union of Distributive Workers. He was President of the Scottish Trades Union Congress in 1934.

He was elected at the 1945 general election as the Member of Parliament (MP) for Western Renfrewshire, defeating the sitting Unionist MP Henry Scrymgeour-Wedderburn.  Scollan served only one term in Parliament, losing his seat at the 1950 general election to the National Liberal candidate John Scott Maclay.

He died on 28 October 1974.

References

External links 
 

1884 births
1974 deaths
Scottish Labour MPs
Members of the Parliament of the United Kingdom for Scottish constituencies
National Union of Distributive and Allied Workers-sponsored MPs
UK MPs 1945–1950
Scottish trade unionists